In 1957, the United States FBI, under Director J. Edgar Hoover, continued for an eighth year to maintain a public list of the people it regarded as the Ten Most Wanted Fugitives.

By 1957 the FBI top ten fugitives list had reached a level of stability not seen again until several decades later.  Since the list was limited to only ten fugitives at a time, the list had become more populated by long-timers, as new captures were becoming more difficult and infrequent. As a result of the low turnover rate, at only four new additions in 1957, that year had now surpassed the prior year as the shortest list of new top tenners added by the FBI in a single year up to that time.

1957 fugitives
The "Ten Most Wanted Fugitives" listed by the FBI in 1957 include (in FBI list appearance sequence order):

Ben Golden McCollum
January 4, 1957 #99
One year on the list
Ben Golden McCollum - US. prisoner arrested March 7, 1958 in a rooming house in Indianapolis, Indiana

Alfred James White
January 14, 1957 #100
One week on the list
Alfred James White - U.S. prisoner arrested January 24, 1957 in Memphis, Tennessee by the FBI after being recognized
by a citizen from a wanted flyer

Robert L. Green
February 11, 1957 #101
Two days on the list
Robert L. Green - U.S. prisoner arrested February 13, 1957 in St. Paul, Minnesota by the FBI, while he was about to board a bus en route to Milwaukee, Wisconsin, after a citizen had recognized his photograph in the Minneapolis Star newspaper

George Edward Cole
February 25, 1957 #102
Two years on the list
George Edward Cole - U.S. prisoner arrested July 6, 1959 in Des Moines, Iowa by the FBI after a citizen recognized
Cole's female companion from a photograph on a wanted flyer

Later entries
FBI Ten Most Wanted Fugitives, 2020s
FBI Ten Most Wanted Fugitives, 2010s
FBI Ten Most Wanted Fugitives, 2000s
FBI Ten Most Wanted Fugitives, 1990s
FBI Ten Most Wanted Fugitives, 1980s
FBI Ten Most Wanted Fugitives, 1970s
FBI Ten Most Wanted Fugitives, 1960s
FBI Ten Most Wanted Fugitives, 1950s

External links
Current FBI top ten most wanted fugitives at FBI site
FBI pdf source document listing all Ten Most Wanted year by year (removed by FBI)

1957 in the United States